The 1982 Iowa Hawkeyes football team represented the University of Iowa in the 1982 Big Ten Conference football season. The Hawkeyes, led by head coach Hayden Fry, were members of the Big Ten Conference and played their home games at Kinnick Stadium. Iowa finished the season 8–4 (6–2 Big Ten), capped by a Peach Bowl victory over Tennessee.

Schedule

Roster

Game summaries

at Nebraska

Source: Box Score and Game Story

Iowa State

Source: Box Score

at Arizona

Northwestern

Source: Box Score and Game Story

at Indiana

Michigan

at Minnesota

Source: Box Score 
    
    
    
    
    
    
    

Chuck Long scored on a pair of short touchdown runs and Eddie Phillips rushed for 198 yards and another score.

Illinois

Source: Box Score and Game Story
    
    
    
    
    

The Hawkeyes earned their first home win over the Fighting Illini since the 1974 season.

at Purdue

Source: Box Score and Game Story

Wisconsin

Source: Box Score and Game Story
    
    
    
    
    
    

The Hawkeyes recorded a school-record seven interceptions against the Badgers. Owen Gill ran for 157 yards and two touchdowns, and Chuck Long added two 1-yard touchdown runs.

at Michigan State

vs. Tennessee (Peach Bowl)

    
    
    
    
    
    
    
    

Iowa earned its first bowl victory since 1959.

Postseason Awards
Reggie Roby - All-American (Punter), Led nation with a 48.1-yard average

Team players in the 1983 NFL Draft

References

Iowa
Iowa Hawkeyes football seasons
Peach Bowl champion seasons
Iowa Hawkeyes football